The 1912 United States presidential election in Texas took place on November 5, 1912, as part of the 1912 United States presidential election. Texas voters chose 20 representatives, or electors, to the Electoral College, who voted for president and vice president.

Texas was won by Princeton University President Woodrow Wilson (D–Virginia), running with governor of Indiana Thomas R. Marshall, with 72.73% of the popular vote, against the 27th president of the United States William Howard Taft (R–Ohio), running with Columbia University President Nicholas Murray Butler, with 9.45% of the popular vote, the 26th president of the United States Theodore Roosevelt (P–New York), running with governor of California Hiram Johnson, with 8.86% of the popular vote and the five-time candidate of the Socialist Party of America for President of the United States Eugene V. Debs (S–Indiana), running with the first Socialist mayor of a major city in the United States Emil Seidel, with 8.25% of the popular vote. , this is the last election in which Webb County voted Republican.

Results

See also
 United States presidential elections in Texas

References

Texas
1912
1912 Texas elections